Hans Erfurt (born 6 February 1964) is a Danish former footballer who played as a forward for Viborg FF and Silkeborg IF. He made two appearances for the Denmark national team in 1989.

References

External links
 
 

1964 births
Living people
People from Randers
Danish men's footballers
Association football forwards
Denmark international footballers
Viborg FF players
Silkeborg IF players
Sportspeople from the Central Denmark Region